Shaiza Said Khan (born 18 March 1969) is a Pakistani former cricketer who played as a right-arm leg break bowler and right-handed batter. She and her sister, Sharmeen, are considered pioneers of women's cricket in Pakistan. She appeared in three Test matches and 40 One Day Internationals for Pakistan between 1997 and 2004, captaining the side throughout this period. She played domestic cricket for Karachi.

Shaiza Khan was born to a wealthy carpet merchant in Karachi. She attended the Convent of Jesus and Mary, Karachi and then joined the Concord College, Acton Burnell, Shropshire for her O & A Levels. She later on went to University of Leeds where she studied Textile Engineering, as well as becoming the first non-British captain of the women's cricket team. She also played a match for Middlesex in 1991, against East Anglia, in which she took 6/39 from her 11 overs.

She holds the world record the best bowling figures in a Test match, taking 13/226 against the West Indies in 2004 in Karachi. During her 13 wicket haul she also took a hat-trick, the second in women's Test history after Betty Wilson.

She also held the record for the most wickets on a single ground in WODIs, with 23 wickets at National Stadium, Karachi, until it was broken by Shabnim Ismail in 2019.

References

External links

1969 births
Living people
Cricketers from Karachi
Pakistan women Test cricketers
Pakistan women One Day International cricketers
Pakistani women cricket captains
Karachi women cricketers
Women's Test cricket hat-trick takers
People educated at Concord College, Acton Burnell
Alumni of the University of Leeds
Convent of Jesus and Mary, Karachi alumni